Union for Democratic Renewal is the name of two national political parties:
 Union for Democratic Renewal (Republic of the Congo)
 Union for Democratic Renewal (Senegal)